John Chester (1749–1809) was a militia officer and public official from Connecticut. Before the American Revolution, he was a militia officer and member of the Connecticut General Assembly. During the American Revolutionary War, he saw action from the Battle of Bunker Hill to the Battle of Trenton as part of Connecticut's troops, but he did not join the Continental Army, and left military service after 1776. He served as Speaker of the Connecticut House of Representatives, among other public offices, and was an original member of the Society of the Cincinnati. His grandson Samuel Chester Reid served in the United States Navy during the War of 1812.

References

External links
 The Society of the Cincinnati
 The American Revolution Institute

1749 births
1809 deaths
Connecticut militiamen in the American Revolution
Speakers of the Connecticut House of Representatives
Military personnel from Connecticut